Galveston Island State Park is a Texas state park located on western Galveston Island in Galveston County, on the western Gulf Coast in Texas.

Geography
The park protects  of dunes, estuaries, wetlands, brackish ponds, and beaches. It was established in 1975. It is adjacent to the city of Galveston.

Habitats include surf, beach, dunes, coastal prairie, fresh-water ponds, wetlands, bayous and bay shoreline. It has numerous trails for scenery and wildlife viewing. There is a public campground in the park.

History
Galveston Island is a barrier island between Galveston Bay and the Gulf of Mexico.  The island began to form around 5,000 years ago. It took another 3,000 years for the core to become high enough to withstand typical storm surges. American Indians began to visit Galveston Island around 2,000 years ago.

In the 16th century, Spanish exploration initiated European interaction with the indigenous Akokisa and Karankawa peoples. It is believed that Cabeza de Vaca and his crew were shipwrecked here in 1520 and eventually made their way from the island to colonial New Spain (México).

The LaFitte brothers, fleeing the prosecution of pirates in the Caribbean, established a "government" here in 1817, with visions of creating a "Manhattan on the Gulf." Commerce did thrive here, but major storms in 1867, 1871, 1875, and 1886 greatly slowed progress. The Galveston Hurricane of 1900 devastated the island, killing 5000 to 10,000 people, and prompted the construction of the seawall which protects the northern half of the island.

Park establishment
The saga of protecting the land began in 1950. Maco Stewart Jr., whose father founded Stewart Title Company, owned more than 2,000 acres on the island. In his will, he severed the mineral rights from the surface land rights and gave half of the surface and mineral rights to his wife, Virginia Stewart, and divided the other half between his sons from a former marriage, Wells and Maco III. In giving them the surface rights, the senior Maco specified that, upon the death of his wife and sons, his "Galveston Island home" should be given to the state of Texas "to be used and maintained as a fish, game, and oyster preserve and for any other public purpose." The will further stated that his heirs "shall not have any right or authority to convey, mortgage, encumber or in any manner dispose of the `surface' estate."

By the late 1960s, Stewart's heirs wanted a park to be established. In 1969, under the State Parks Bond Program, 1,950 acres of the private land was purchased from the heirs.  A small part of the original property with the family's Stewart Mansion was not included in the sale. The state park opened to the public in 1975.

Dunes renewal projects
Tropical Storm Frances destroyed the sand dunes at Galveston Island State Park on September 10, 1998. The dunes provide the only protection that the park has for its freshwater habitats and visitor facilities. A project restored the dunes through the use of recycled Christmas trees to trap and accumulate sand.

The park was closed again, due to damage from Hurricane Ike on September 14, 2008. In July 2009 the park was reopened for outdoor recreation and camping.

Fauna
The first nest in a decade of the Kemp's ridley sea turtle was found at the park in 2020.

See also
 Sand dune ecology
 List of Texas state parks

References

External links

 Official Galveston Island State Park website
 Friends of Galveston Island State Park — natural history + events info-images.
Film footage of Galveston Island State Park from Exploring the Texas State Park System on the Texas Archive of the Moving Image

State parks of Texas
Protected areas of Galveston County, Texas
Wetlands of Texas
1975 establishments in Texas
Tourist attractions in Galveston, Texas
Landforms of Galveston County, Texas
Protected areas established in 1975